The Espelandsfossen is a waterfall located in the Oddadalen valley in Ullensvang Municipality in Vestland county, Norway. It is one of two waterfalls in Norway that shares the same name (the other one is in nearby Voss Municipality).

See also
List of waterfalls#Norway

References

Ullensvang
Waterfalls of Vestland